Gerhard Mostert is a professional rugby union player who played for Stade Français in the Top 14. He was schooled at Die Hoërskool Rustenburg.

Mostert had previously played for the Golden Lions.
In October 2010, Gerhard was selected to the Springboks squad of 39 players to prepare for the November tour of Europe. He eventually made his Springbok debut during the 2011 Tri Nations Series as injury cover for Johann Muller, in a 40-7 loss against the All Blacks in Wellington. Although it was a miserable day for the team, Mostert, impressed Springbok Coach Peter de Villiers who decided to include Mostert in his 24-man squad for the home tests.

Gerhard Mostert was named on the bench for the third test against the Wallabies in Durban on 30 July 2011. Mostert made his second appearance in the green and gold off the bench for Bakkies Botha.

References

External links

Sharks Profile

Living people
1984 births
Golden Lions players
Lions (United Rugby Championship) players
Sharks (Currie Cup) players
Sharks (rugby union) players
Leopards (rugby union) players
Rugby union locks
People from Rustenburg
Afrikaner people
Stade Français players
South African rugby union players
South Africa international rugby union players
Expatriate rugby union players in France
South African expatriate rugby union players
South African expatriate sportspeople in France
North-West University alumni
Rugby union players from North West (South African province)